West Virginia Route 161 is a north–south state highway located entirely within McDowell County, West Virginia. The northern terminus is at U.S. Route 52 in Elkhorn. 

The state line follows Jacobs Fork and Horsepen Creek, which form a tight bend. There are no signs or visual indications of the state line. West Virginia maintains the road in Virginia.

Major intersections

References

161
Transportation in McDowell County, West Virginia